Ejner Hansen (21 January 1905 – 13 April 1967) was a Danish footballer. He played in one match for the Denmark national football team in 1931.

References

External links
 

1905 births
1967 deaths
Danish men's footballers
Denmark international footballers
Place of birth missing
Association footballers not categorized by position